Emmanuelle Anthoine (born 2 July 1964) is a French politician of the Republicans who was elected to the French National Assembly on 18 June 2017, representing the
4th constituency of the department of Drôme.

In parliament, Anthoine serves on the Committee on Cultural Affairs and Education. In addition to her committee assignments, she is a member of the French-Jordanian Parliamentary Friendship Group.

In the Republicans' 2017 leadership election, Anthoine endorsed Laurent Wauquiez as chairman.

She was re-elected in the 2022 French legislative election.

See also
 2017 French legislative election

References

1964 births
Living people
Deputies of the 15th National Assembly of the French Fifth Republic
The Republicans (France) politicians
People from Drôme
Women members of the National Assembly (France)
21st-century French women politicians

Deputies of the 16th National Assembly of the French Fifth Republic